King Sabata Dalindyebo Local Municipality is a municipality situated in the inland of Eastern Cape Province in South Africa. The municipality is made up of Mthatha and Mqanduli. The King Sabata Dalindyebo Local Municipality is one of the seven local municipalities within the Oliver Reginald Tambo District Municipality. 

The King Sabata Dalindyebo Local Municipality was established before the 2000 local government elections when the Mthatha and Mqanduli transitional and rural areas were merged. The municipality was named after King Sabata Dalindyebo because his great place was in the region and he was seen as a hero who fought for the freedom of Transkei and South Africa.

Main places
The 2001 census divided the municipality into the following main places:

Politics 

The municipal council consists of seventy-two members elected by mixed-member proportional representation. Thirty-seven councillors are elected by first-past-the-post voting in thirty-six wards, while the remaining thirty-six are chosen from party lists so that the total number of party representatives is proportional to the number of votes received. In the election of 1 November 2021 the African National Congress (ANC) won a majority of forty-eight seats on the council.
The following table shows the results of the election.

References

External links
 King Sabata Dalindyebo Municipality

Local municipalities of the OR Tambo District Municipality